Lambton is a suburb of Newcastle, New South Wales, Australia,  from Newcastle's central business district.

Early days 
The Awabakal and Worimi peoples are acknowledged by City of Newcastle as the descendants of the traditional custodians of the land situated within the Newcastle local government area.

Originally a coal-mining township, Lambton was incorporated as a Municipality (including Jesmond, New South Wales), on 24 June 1871. The 1891 Census gave the population as 3,434. It was the first municipality in Newcastle district to be lit by electric light.

In the early years the miners of the township used to entertain themselves gambling on dog races, known as the "Dog & Rat" because they would release a rat (wallaby) on flat open area then let their dogs chase it down. The dog that caught the rat won (the rat won if it made it to the scrub).

In 1901 there were 14 churches, a Music Hall, Assembly Rooms, a Temperance Hall, a Mechanics' Institute, Miners' Institute, a Post, Telegraph and Money Order Office, a Savings Bank, Court House, Fire Brigade, Council Chambers, and fine public schools. There were collieries, coke-ovens and a soap-works at Jesmond.

In 1901 the Municipal Council had as Mayor: Matthew Thornton and Town Clerk: Thomas Johnson. In 1938 an Act of the New South Wales Parliament created a "City of Greater Newcastle", incorporating 11 municipalities into one local government area, including Lambton.

Historically Lambton has played an important part in the sporting history of the Hunter Region. Lambton Park was also the location of the first organised soccer match played in Australia between miners from Lambton and miners from Weston. Newcastle oldest rugby league football club "Western Suburbs (NCLE) Rosella's" was formed at Smiths Pub (also known as "Snake Gully" and "Bar 121")

The Member of the New South Wales Legislative Assembly who represented Lambton was Arthur Hill Griffith, Member for Waratah.

Colliery 

The largest and principal industry was the Scottish-Australian Coal Mining Company's Lambton Colliery, mine and estate managed by the three Croudace brothers: Frank, Thomas, and Sydney. It finally closed in the late 1950s although the railway line which connected it with Newcastle harbour was operational for about another decade because of other coal-loading facilities still operational at the mine. Today the entire area is covered with housing.

Mechanics Institute 
First opened in Howe Street in 1867 by Thomas Croudace. In 1885 a second weatherboard hall was built with a reading and billiards room. In 1894 a stone and brick building built and institute moved to Elder street at a cost of  £573 with a library and games room on the ground floor with a bigger reading room on the upper floor. The committee rented the Howe street space to various organisations until August 1903. In 1950 Newcastle opened a library across the road from the institute which lost them huge membership numbers. The building is now the home to the Newcastle Family History Society and MG Car Club. In 2018, New South Wales State Government gave a grant of $45,000 to re paint the exterior.

Education 

 On 15 Young Road is a co-ed government high school, Lambton High School
 On 20 Croudace Street is a co-ed government primary, Lambton Public School
 On Dickson Street is a co-ed catholic primary school, St John's Primary School

Population
According to the 2016 census of Population, there were 4,909 people in Lambton.
 Aboriginal and Torres Strait Islander people made up 2.6% of the population. 
 84.3% of people were born in Australia. The next most common country of birth was England at 2.1%.   
 87.3% of people spoke only English at home. 
 The most common responses for religion were No Religion 29.2%, Catholic 24.9% and Anglican 18.8%.

Other 

Lambton boasted a popular cinema, the King's Theatre, which still operated as such into the 1980s. It is today a theatre-restaurant known as "Lizottes".

One of the great attractions of the town centre is the magnificent Lambton Park, which contains a 19th-century bandstand (renovated since, and better known to locals as "The Rotunda"), children's play area, bowling greens, tennis courts, cricket, soccer and rugby league fields, Olympic size swimming pool, diving pool, children and toddler pools, and beautiful gardens.

Lambton Jaffa's Soccer team boast products such as Australian Woman team captain Cheryl Salisbury and Australian Women's basketball player Suzy Batkovic-Brown.

A song called "The Lambton Lights" by Newcastle musician Bob Corbett was written about the electrification of the town.

Notes

External links 

Suburbs of Newcastle, New South Wales